East River Park, also called John V. Lindsay East River Park, is  public park located on the Lower East Side of Manhattan, administered by the New York City Department of Parks and Recreation. Bisected by the Williamsburg Bridge, it stretches along the East River from Montgomery Street up to 12th Street on the east side of the FDR Drive. Its now-demolished amphitheater, built in 1941 just south of Grand Street, had been reconstructed and was often used for public performances. The park includes football, baseball, and soccer fields; tennis, basketball, and handball courts; a running track; and bike paths, including the East River Greenway. Fishing is another popular activity, for now.

The park and the surrounding neighborhood were flooded during Hurricane Sandy in 2012 prompting the city officials to consider flood mitigation plans that would alter it. In December 2019, the New York City Council voted to approve the controversial $1.45 billion East Side Coastal Resiliency project, involving the park's complete demolition and subsequent renovation, and is slated for completion in 2026. A New York Harbor Storm-Surge Barrier is also under consideration, which would also demolish and rebuild this and other parks.

History 
Conceived in the early 1930s by Robert Moses, East River Park opened on July 27, 1939. Prior to this time, the East River waterfront had been an active shipping yard and later became home to many of the city's poorest immigrants. The park became the largest open green space on the Lower East Side.  Since that time, the park has been encroached upon by various developments such as the widening of the FDR Drive and the extension of South Street. Still, the park provides a respite for residents of the Lower East Side, particularly in summer months when there are refreshing breezes from the river.

In 1998, through an agreement with the New York City Parks Department, the Lower East Side Ecology Center became the steward of the park. For 20 years, this local environmental nonprofit has been the park's caretaker and had its offices and education center inside the Fire Boat House, located in the park near the Williamsburg Bridge. Each year the Ecology Center led thousands of volunteers in up-keeping the park, tending to garden beds, and enhancing the park by planting hundreds of thousands of native plants and bulbs.

After the September 11, 2001 attacks, the city rebuilt the amphitheater, which had fallen into disrepair. A new soccer field was also built at this time.  Companies throughout the U.S. donated materials for the reconstruction, and the project was finished in record time and dedicated to those children who lost parents in the attacks. In December 2001, East River Park was renamed after former New York City Mayor John Lindsay.

In 2008 the City Parks Foundation brought free music, dance, and theater arts programming to the amphitheater in an effort to further engage the surrounding communities in the revitalization of the park. The first performance held was a music concert by Fiery Furnaces which drew an audience of 1,500. KRS-One and Willie Colón also performed in 2008, drawing crowds upward of 3,000 people.

Hurricane Sandy and renovation 
Hurricane Sandy flooded the East River Park and the Lower East Side in 2012 prompting the city to consider flood mitigation plans that would alter the park. In June 2013, U.S. Department of Housing and Urban Development (HUD) secretary Shaun Donovan launched Rebuild by Design, a competition which called for experts to develop solutions for neighborhoods disproportionately impacted by Hurricane Sandy. Ten of the 150 proposals were selected as finalists, and seven received a total of $930 million in federal grants. The largest grant, totaling $335 million, was given to the "Big U" proposal, a berm surrounding Lower Manhattan. One of the largest segments of the Big U was known as the East Side Coastal Resiliency project, and would work to improve the resiliency of East River Park and the surrounding Lower East Side neighborhood. The resulting plan, supported by local residents, elected officials, and advocacy groups, included an 8-foot berm along FDR Drive from East 23rd Street to Montgomery Street, which would decrease the severity of flooding in the surrounded area.  From 2015 to 2018 city agencies continued the process of participatory design that the Big U's designers had commenced.

Starting in early 2018 the city underwent a months long internal "value engineering review", in which they met with designers and planners to determine the feasibility of the proposal. A FOIA request for documentation of this review process revealed several obstacles to the original plan, including concerns about flooding and the location of high-voltage Con-Edison power lines. In September 2018 the office of Mayor Bill de Blasio announced that, based on the findings of the internal value engineering review, the proposed berm would be completely removed and the whole park would be raised. It was claimed that the new plan would be faster and less disruptive, moving the bulk of the construction away from residents directly alongside FDR Drive, instead placing the improvements alongside the water. The new plan was referred to by its engineers as the "Value Alternative LI-29" plan.” The review determined that this plan would be not only be more effective but also cheaper and faster, a concern that addressed the 2022 deadline associated with HUD funding (now extended to 2023).

Following their announcement, the plan had to be approved by Community Boards 3 and 6, and then the  New York City Council. In July 2019, the new plan was presented to Community Board 3 by the Department of Design and Construction (DDC), following several months of public consultation with residents. The City Council typically defers to incumbent councilmembers regarding land-use decisions in their districts; in the East River Park decision, these were councilmembers Margaret Chin of District 1 and Carlina Rivera of District 2. Both councilmembers secured concessions from the city. Original plans called for closing the park entirely from 2020 to 2023, but after protests from residents, the plans were modified in late 2019 to a partial five-year closure.

Criticism 
Critics of the current renovation plan have voiced concerns over the cost, oversight, lack of resident involvement, destruction of plants (including more than 1,000 mature trees), and animal habitats. One alternative presented by critics was a plan for storm barriers along the FDR. Community members argue that the park closure will primarily impact low-income NYCHA residents and that the renovation project will leave the Lower East Side especially vulnerable to storm surge during the renovation.

Supporters of the current plan include Councilwoman Rivera, other Democratic politicians, and Good Old Lower East Side (GOLES).

In February 2020, a dozen groups and 75 individuals, including members of East River Park Action, sued the city to stop the ESCR based on the grounds that the plan constitutes park alienation and requires approval from the state legislature. State Supreme Court Justice Melissa Crane ruled against opposition groups and in August 2020, the city was given approval to begin park demolition. The demolition began in December 2021, prompting protests and court orders against the work. State assemblymember for the district Yuh-Line Niou and incoming city councilman for the Lower East Side and the East Village Christopher Marte expressed support for the protesters.

Construction 
In early 2022, construction on the southern half of the park commenced, beginning with the demolition of athletic fields, the amphitheater, and a section of the East River Esplinade. Work is expected to last until 2026, during which time significant sections of the park will be closed.

The city announced that it had completed asbestos abatement in October 2022, nine months after the demolition of the amphitheater. The asbestos was found in a sub-basement structure under the amphitheater, and has raised concerns by activists.

See also
List of contemporary amphitheatres
List of New York City parks
East River Esplanade

References

External links

NYC Department of Parks & Recreation info for the park
East River Park Action's website
Forgotten-NY profile of East River Park

Parks in Manhattan
East River
Robert Moses projects
Lower East Side
Manhattan Waterfront Greenway